The 2014 Hong Kong Tennis Open was a women's professional tennis tournament played on hard courts. It was part of the 2014 WTA Tour and a return of the Hong Kong Open women's tennis tournament last held in 1993. It took place in Victoria Park, Hong Kong, from September 8 to 14.

Points and prize money

Point distribution

Prize money

1 Qualifiers prize money is also the Round of 32 prize money
* per team

Singles main-draw entrants

Seeds

 1 Rankings are as of August 25, 2014

Other entrants
The following players received wildcards into the singles main draw:
  Duan Yingying
  Sabine Lisicki
  Zhang Ling

The following players received entry from the qualifying draw:
  Jarmila Gajdošová
  Elizaveta Kulichkova
  Zhang Kailin
  Zhu Lin

The following player received entry as a lucky loser:
  Misa Eguchi

Withdrawals
Before the tournament
  Zarina Diyas → replaced by  Grace Min
  Vania King → replaced by  Julia Glushko
  Kurumi Nara → replaced by  Kimiko Date-Krumm
  Peng Shuai (heat illness) → replaced by  Misa Eguchi
  Sílvia Soler Espinosa → replaced by  Alison Van Uytvanck
  Elina Svitolina → replaced by  Kristýna Plíšková
  Barbora Záhlavová-Strýcová → replaced by  Luksika Kumkhum
  Zhang Shuai → replaced by  Zheng Saisai

Retirements
  Kimiko Date-Krumm

Doubles main-draw entrants

Seeds

1 Rankings are as of August 25, 2014

Other entrants 
The following pairs received wildcards into the doubles main draw:
  Venise Chan /  Wu Ho-ching
  Magda Linette /  Zhang Ling

Champions

Singles

  Sabine Lisicki defeated  Karolína Plíšková, 7–5, 6–3

Doubles

  Karolína Plíšková /  Kristýna Plíšková defeated  Patricia Mayr-Achleitner /  Arina Rodionova, 6–2, 2–6, [12–10]

References

External links
Official site

Hong Kong Open (tennis)
Hong Kong Open (tennis)
Hong Kong Tennis Open
Hong Kong Tennis Open
Hong Kong Tennis Open